Alverstone Marshes is an 83.8 hectare biological Site of Special Scientific Interest on the Isle of Wight, notified in 1951.

The Alverstone Marshes are the site of a wetland restoration project by the Royal Society for the Protection of Birds.
It is also noted for water voles.

References

Sources
 English Nature citation sheet for the site  (accessed 5 August 2006)

External links
 English Nature (SSSI information)
 Site boundary map at English Nature's "Nature on the Map" website

Sites of Special Scientific Interest on the Isle of Wight
Sites of Special Scientific Interest notified in 1951
Marshes of England